Tracey Hall, or Tracey Hall Yarbrough, is a former women's basketball player for Ohio State University. She became the Big-Ten's first two-time Kodak All-American team member competing in 1987 and 1988. At Ohio State University, she still ranks #1 in rebounds, #1 in FG%, #2 in scoring, #3 in steals and #4 in games played.

She ranks second on the school's all-time scoring list with 1,912 career points and 1 60.0 Field Goal Percentage. She also owns the school's rebounding record with 1,115. She is the only player in school history to get 300 rebounds in a single season. She started every game of her collegiate career, scored in double figures in 101 games. During her tenure, Ohio State's record was an incredible 102–20. In 1986, she was selected as the Ohio State athlete of the year.

Personal life 
Tracey and her husband, Reese Yarbrough, were childhood friends.  They have two sons.

Recognitions 
 Selected for Induction into the OSU Sports Hall of Fame 1998
 Big Ten Player of the Year 1987
 Big Ten Player of the Year 1986
 Big Ten Freshman of the Year
 Second Team all-Big Ten 1985
 OSU Letterwinner 1985 to 1988
recognitions citation

Team memberships 
 Big Ten All-Decade team
 Kodak All-American team 1988
 OSU Team 1988
 OSU team of 1988 competed in the NCAA Sweet 16
 World University Gates Team 1987
 Kodak All-American team 1987
 OSU Team 1987
 OSU team of 1987 competed in the NCAA final eight
 OSU team of 1987 played in co-championship
 USA Basketball Select Team 1986
 OSU Team 1986
 OSU team of 1986 competed in the NCAA Sweet 16
 OSU team of 1986 played in Big Ten championship
 OSU Team 1985
 OSU team of 1985 competed in the NCAA final eight
 OSU team of 1985 played in Big Ten championship
memberships citation

Ohio State statistics

Source

USA Basketball
Hall was selected to be a member of the team representing the US at the 1987 World University Games held in Zagreb, Yugoslavia. The USA team won four of the five contests. After winning their next game against Finland, the USA faced the host team Yugoslavia. The game went to overtime, but Yugoslavia prevailed, 93–89. The USA faced China in the next game. They won 84–83, but they needed to win by at least five points to remain in medal contention. They won the final game against Canada to secure fifth place. Hall averaged 9.6 points per game and 4.0 rebounds per game.

References

Year of birth missing (living people)
Living people
All-American college women's basketball players
American women's basketball players
Ohio State Buckeyes women's basketball players